The Cabinet Secretary for Social Security and Older People was a position in the Scottish Government Cabinet. The Cabinet Secretary had overall responsibility for social security, equality and human rights. The Cabinet Secretary was assisted by a junior Minister, the Minister for Older People and Equalities.

At the start of the third Sturgeon government the post was combined with that of Communities and Local Government in a new position of Cabinet Secretary for Social Justice, Housing and Local Government.

Overview

Responsibilities
The responsibilities of the Cabinet Secretary for  Social Security and Older People included:

Devolved welfare policy
Devolved social security
Measures against poverty (with CSCLG)
Best Start Grant
Best Start Foods
Funeral Support Payment
Job Start Payment
Carers Allowance Supplement
Carer's Assistance
Young Carers Grant
Disability Assistance
Employment Injury Assistance
Cold Spell Heating Assistance
Winter Heating Assistance
Scottish Child Payment
Equalities
The protection and development of social and human rights
Elderly people
Cross Government co-ordination of policies in support of women and gender equality

Public bodies
The following public bodies reported to the Cabinet Secretary for Social Security and Older People:
 Social Security Scotland

History 
The position was first created as a junior ministerial role, the Minister for Social Security in May 2016, to reflect the increased powers of the Scottish Government over Social Security as a result of the Scotland Act 2016. The Minister for Social Security did not attend cabinet meetings, instead being represented by the Cabinet Secretary for Communities, Social Security and Equalities, Angela Constance MSP. In June 2018 the position was raised to Cabinet Secretary level. The position was abolished at the start of the third Sturgeon government with responsibility for social security again being combined with the communities brief in a new position of Cabinet Secretary for Social Justice, Housing and Local Government.

List of office holders

References

External links 
 Cabinet Secretary for Social Security and Older People on the Scottish Government website

Scottish Parliament
Former Ministerial posts of the Scottish Government